"Tough World" is a song by American rock musician Donnie Iris from his 1982 album The High and the Mighty. The song was released as a single the same year and reached #57 on the U.S. Billboard Hot 100, #63 on Cash Box, and #26 on the U.S. Billboard Mainstream Rock chart.

Charts

References

External links
Lyrics of this song
 

Donnie Iris songs
1982 singles
Songs written by Mark Avsec
1982 songs
MCA Records singles
Songs written by Donnie Iris
Songs written by Marty Lee Hoenes